Boxing competitions at the 2022 South American Games in Asunción, Paraguay are being held from 8 to 13 October 2022 at Pabellón 1 of the SND Complex.

Thirteen medal events are scheduled to be contested; seven weight categories for men and six weight categories for women. A total of 88 athletes (54 men and 34 women) are competing in the events. Participating boxers must have been born between 1 January 1982 and 31 December 2003.

Colombia are the South American Games boxing competitions defending champions having won them in the previous edition in Cochabamba 2018.

Participating nations
A total of 13 nations registered athletes for the boxing events. Each nation was able to enter a maximum of 13 boxers (7 men and 6 women), one boxer for each weight category.

 (9 boxers)
 (6)
 (12)
 (5)
 (13)
 (2)
 (8)
 (3)
 (2)
 (8)
 (5)
 (4)
 (11)

Venue
The boxing competitions are scheduled to be held at Pabellón 1 of the SND Complex.

Medal summary

Medal table

Medalists

Men's events

Women's events

References

External links
 ASU2022 Boxing

2022 South American Games events
2022
South American Games